James Joseph Puplava (born 1950) is an investment analyst, financial planner and financial podcast host born in Gary, Indiana. He is the founder and president of Financial Sense Wealth Management. He is also chief author and host for the Financial Sense Newshour. His companies manage $500 million for more than 825 clients.

Background
Puplava was raised in Arizona by Czechoslovakian immigrant parents.  He grew up in a family of 10 children.

Puplava graduated cum laude in History and Economics from Arizona State University. He then went on to graduate summa cum laude with a Master's Degree in Finance and Accounting from the American Graduate School of International Management (Thunderbird).

Puplava is a Certified Financial Planner, Certified Tax Specialist, Certified Income Specialist, Certified Estate and Trust Specialist, Certified Fund Specialist, Certified Annuity Specialist, Accredited Investment Fiduciary, Certified Social Security Specialist, Financial Planning & Wealth Management Professional, Series 7, Series 24, and Series 65 with the Financial Industry Regulatory Authority (FINRA); and Life, Disability and Variable Insurance licenses. Puplava has been president of Financial Sense Wealth Management since 1985. For twelve years, he held a position as Branch Manager for LPL Financial Services, LLC. In 1996, he incorporated the broker/dealer firm, Financial Sense® Securities, Inc. (PSI) and is its president.

He has worked as a financial writer to various publications and acted as a TV business editor. In 1988, Puplava began hosting Financial Sense Talk radio on various radio stations in San Diego. He oversees the portfolio management team at Financial Sense Wealth Management and Financial Sense® Securities. He now hosts weekly podcasts and writes commentary for 'financialsense.com'.

Career

Puplava provides financial education with his Financial Sense Newshour
 podcast. He clearly seconds the views of the Austrian School of economics and sees an inflationary outcome of current fiscal and financial policies. Still his interview platform Financial Sense Newshour provides a space for guests seconding and opposing his opinion.
Puplava currently advocates investment in dividend-paying stocks. He warns about the negative effects of financial repression on future bond prices and advocates laddered bond portfolios vs. bond funds. He sees precious metals like gold or silver as an insurance protection against a possible inflationary development or even a crash of the fiat money system. His news show provides not only a platform for well-known experts seconding his opinion, but he also airs opposing views.

Peak oil
Puplava is an expert on the theory of peak oil and its consequences for the financial landscape, and was a speaker at the ASPO conference in 2008. He has interviewed several peak oil proponents on his radio program, including Richard Heinberg, Matt Simmons, Jim Kunstler, Robert L. Hirsch and Oxford University's Oliver Inderwildi.

TV roles and appearances
In 1991, Puplava was hired to anchor the nightly segment Business Today for KUSI TV. He appeared on ABC News's Nightline program on November 8, 2007, in a segment called "Sign of the Times" with John Donovan.

Financial Sense Wealth Management
Originally Puplava Financial Services, known today as Financial Sense Wealth Management, began as an investment and money management firm. What started off as a small financial planning service in 1985 has since grown to a full team of portfolio managers and client service managers with the benefit of a broker-dealer arm to service other advisors and representatives, with financial planning at the core of what they do each day. Two of Jim's three sons work with him in a professional capacity. His oldest son, Ryan Puplava, is the CEO of Financial Sense Wealth Management and his second-oldest son, Chris Puplava, is the Chief Investment Officer of Financial Sense Wealth Management.

Kimber Resources proxy battle
Kimber Resources is a Canadian-based company listed on the Toronto Stock Exchange and the American Stock Exchange and is engaged in the development and exploration of mineral properties in Mexico, of which the most advanced project is the Monterde gold/silver property. Puplava was elected to Kimber's Board of Directors in May 2004. In September 2006, a press release issued by Kimber Resources reported a disagreement. Puplava, by then a director and significant shareholder, stated his intention to start a proxy battle with the objective of replacing a majority of the Board of Directors and current management.
Late October 2006, Puplava agreed to withdraw his threat for a proxy battle when the board of directors agreed to changes in the management team.

Personal life
Puplava and his wife Mary, who also acted as his office manager and webmaster from 1990 to 2018, live in Poway, near San Diego, California, near their three sons. Puplava is a history buff, an avid reader and loves sailing. Puplava has also appeared as a guest speaker for Koinonia House conferences.

Achievements
2009 — Selected by Goldline Research, as published in Forbes, as one of the leading wealth managers of Southern California for 2009
2008 — Received a "Five Star Wealth Manager" award after being nominated as one of the San Diego area's best wealth managers, as based on nine criteria: customer service, integrity, knowledge/expertise, communication, value for fee charged, meeting of financial objectives, post-sale service, quality of recommendations and overall satisfaction. (As published in the February 2008 issue of San Diego Magazine.)
1992 — Puplava was honored as one of America's top ten financial representatives by Registered Representative magazine.

References

External links
 Financial Sense News Hour, with Jim Puplava
 The PFS Group
 Riders on a Storm — Essay by Jim Puplava published by World Energy Monthly Review
  — Jim Puplava and Gerald Celente

Living people
American businesspeople
Internet radio in the United States
American infotainers
People from Poway, California
American talk radio hosts
1950 births
Thunderbird School of Global Management alumni